Georgios Gaitanaros (1918–1987) was a Greek chess player. He won the Greek Chess Championship three times (1951, 1952, 1953).

Biography
In the 1950s Georgios Gaitanaros was a leading Greek chess player. He won the Greek Chess Championships three-times in a row: from the 1951 to the 1953.

Georgios Gaitanaros played for Greece in the Chess Olympiad:
 In 1952, at first board in the 10th Chess Olympiad in Helsinki (+3, =2, −6).

References

External links

Georgios Gaitanaros chess games at 365chess.com

1918 births
1987 deaths
Greek chess players
Chess Olympiad competitors
20th-century Greek people